Oto Yanovich Grigalka (28 June 1925 – 8 February 1993) was a Latvian track and field athlete who competed in the shot put and discus throw. He represented the Soviet Union at the Summer Olympics in 1952 and 1956. He placed fourth in the shot put and sixth in the discus in 1952,then came fifth at the 1956 Olympic discus competition.

Grigalka was twice a medallist for the Soviet Union at the European Athletics Championships, taking shot put bronze in 1950, then the shot put silver in 1954. He also competed in the discus at the latter edition, placing sixth. He was highly successful as a student-athlete at the World Festival of Youth and Students, taking three consecutive shot put silver medals before winning the gold medal in 1955.

At national level he was a seven-time winner at the Soviet Athletics Championships, taking three straight shot put titles from 1952 to 1954 and going undefeated in the discus throw from 1953 to 1956. During his career he was a member of the Dynamo Moscow sports club and was trained by Leonīds Mitropoļskis. He later went into coaching and was throws coach to the 1964 Olympic Soviet team.

He was highly ranked in the discus throw during the latter part of his career, placing third on the world seasonal lists for the event in 1955 and 1958. His best yearly placing in the shot put was fifth,  which he achieved in both 1951 and 1954.

He was born and died in Saikava, a small village in Latvia's Madona Municipality. He married a fellow Soviet track athlete, Mariya Pisareva who won an Olympic high jump medal.

International competitions

National titles
Soviet Athletics Championships
Shot put: 1952, 1953, 1954
Discus throw: 1953, 1954, 1955, 1956

See also
List of European Athletics Championships medalists (men)

References

1925 births
1993 deaths
Latvian male shot putters
Soviet male shot putters
Latvian male discus throwers
Soviet male discus throwers
Latvian sports coaches
Soviet athletics coaches
Olympic athletes of the Soviet Union
Athletes (track and field) at the 1952 Summer Olympics
Athletes (track and field) at the 1956 Summer Olympics
European Athletics Championships medalists
People from Madona Municipality